Maria Ulrika Kalte, born 19 May 1970 in Skärholmen, Sweden is a Swedish former association football player. She played for Älvsjö AIK and the Swedish national team during the 1995 World Cup in Sweden, where Sweden was knocked out in the quarterfinal game. and the 1996 Olympic Tournament in Atlanta, where Sweden ended up 6th.

She began playing for Norsborgs FF, before becoming a professional in Japan. as she moved to Shiroki F.C. Serena after the 1995 World Cup.

International career 

In May 1989 Kalte made her national team debut at Wembley Stadium, as Sweden beat England 2–0 in a curtain raiser for the Rous Cup.

Down 0-1 to China in the Quarter-Finals of the 1995 World Cup, Ulrika scored an equalizer in the 3rd minute of second half stoppage time to draw level and keep the hosts alive. Her team kept the match tied through extra time, but were eliminated from the tournament in a penalty kick shootout.

References

External links

1970 births
Footballers at the 1996 Summer Olympics
Living people
Olympic footballers of Sweden
Shiroki FC Serena players
Nadeshiko League players
Swedish expatriate women's footballers
Swedish women's footballers
Expatriate women's footballers in Japan
Sweden women's international footballers
1995 FIFA Women's World Cup players
Swedish expatriate sportspeople in Japan
Footballers from Stockholm
Women's association football forwards
Sundbybergs IK players
Hammarby Fotboll (women) players
Älvsjö AIK (women) players